"Nothing On but the Radio" is a song written by Byron Hill, Odie Blackmon, and Brice Long and recorded by American country music artist Gary Allan. It was released in June 2004 as the third and last single from Allan's 2003 album See If I Care. The song became Allan's third number one hit on the U.S. Billboard Hot Country Songs chart in December 2004, and it would be his last until "Every Storm (Runs Out of Rain)" reached that position in 2013. The song also peaked at number 32 on the U.S. Billboard Hot 100 chart. The song even won an ASCAP Award for being among the most performed country songs of 2005. The song was later included on Allan's Greatest Hits album.

Content
The narrator talks about dancing with his lover with "nothing on but the radio".

Critical reception
Deborah Evans Price of Billboard magazine reviewed the song favorably, calling the lyric a "light and breezy look at the beginnings of a new relationship. It's nothing deep, just frisky and fun." She goes on to say that the lead guitar starts the song and the melody "immediately catches listeners' attention-and the steel guitar and fiddle-laced production set the perfect stage for Allan's country-boy vocal."

Chart performance
"Nothing On but the Radio" debuted at number 52 on the U.S. Billboard Hot Country Songs for the week of June 26, 2004.

Year-end charts

Certifications

References

2004 singles
2003 songs
Gary Allan songs
Songs written by Byron Hill
Songs about radio
MCA Nashville Records singles
Songs written by Brice Long
Song recordings produced by Mark Wright (record producer)
Songs written by Odie Blackmon
MCA Records singles